Enicopus is a genus of soft-winged flower beetles belonging to the family Melyridae, subfamily Dasytinae. Species in this genus are present in most of Europe and in the eastern Palearctic realm.

Species
Enicopus andradei Pardo, 1966
Enicopus armatus (Lucas, 1849)
Enicopus calcaratus Kiesenwetter, 1859
Enicopus confusus Jacquelin Du Val, 1860
Enicopus distinguendus Jacquelin Du Val, 1860
Enicopus espagnoli Pardo, 1966
Enicopus gracilis Schilsky, 1896
Enicopus heydeni Kiesenwetter, 1870
Enicopus hirtus (Linnaeus, 1767)
Enicopus hoplotarsus Jacquelin Du Val, 1860
Enicopus ibericus Jacquelin Du Val, 1860
Enicopus korbi Schilsky, 1896
Enicopus lagari Pardo, 1966
Enicopus longimanus Kiesenwetter, 1859
Enicopus parnassi Kiesenwetter, 1859
Enicopus paulinoi Bourgeois, 1884
Enicopus perezi Kiesenwetter, 1867
Enicopus pilosus (Scopoli, 1763)
Enicopus pyrenaeus Fairmaire, 1859
Enicopus rugosicollis Jacquelin Du Val, 1860
Enicopus scutellaris (Fabricius, 1792)
Enicopus simplicipes Jacquelin Du Val, 1860
Enicopus spiniger Jacquelin Du Val, 1860
Enicopus truncatus Fairmaire, 1859
Enicopus vittatus Kiesenwetter, 1859

References 

 Biolib
 Fauna europaea

Cleroidea genera
Melyridae
Beetles of Europe